Art's Gallery is a daily comic strip by Art Finley which lasted from 1962 to 1981. It was featured in the San Francisco Chronicle during its run and was syndicated by Chronicle Features from 1962 to 1977, when it moved to Universal Press Syndicate until 1981. The strip consisted of 19th-century woodcut panels from the Chronicle's archives, to which Finley added humorous and contemporary captions.

References

Notes

Sources 
 

American comic strips
Gag cartoon comics
Gag-a-day comics
1962 comics debuts
1981 comics endings